Holcocerus gloriosus is a species of moth of the family Cossidae. It is found in Turkmenistan, Uzbekistan, southern Kazakhstan, Iran, Afghanistan, Iraq, Jordan, Israel, northern Egypt, Saudi Arabia, Bahrain and Oman. The habitat consists of deserts.

The length of the forewings is 12–20 mm for males and 16–21 mm for females. The forewings are white with a small brown points at the veins. The hindwings are white. Adults have been recorded on wing from February to May in Israel.

Subspecies
Holcocerus gloriosus gloriosus
Holcocerus gloriosus laudabilis Staudinger, 1899 (Jordan, Israel, Egypt: Sinai, Saudi Arabia, Oman, Bahrain)
Holcocerus gloriosus mesopotamicus Watkins & Buxton, 1921 (Iran, Iraq, southern Afghanistan)

References

Moths described in 1874
Cossinae
Moths of Asia
Moths of the Middle East